American Horse may refer to:

People 
American Horse (elder) (1830–1876), Lakota chieftain and uncle to American Horse the younger 
American Horse (1840–1908), chief of the Oglala Lakota, son of Sitting Bear and son-in-law of Red Cloud 
American Horse (Cheyenne) or Ve'ho'evo'ha ("He-Has-A-White-Man's-Horse"), chief of the Northern Suhtai band of the Northern Cheyenne and part of the Council of Forty-four, prominent warrior in the Battle of the Little Big Horn

Animals 
Equus scotti, the extinct native American horse
Other extinct equids from North America, such as Equus conversidens and Equus lambei
Mustang, modern-day free-ranging horses descended from domestic stock of European explorers and colonists

Other uses
American Horse Creek, a stream in South Dakota
"American Horse", a song from the album Sonic Temple by The Cult